The Josephson junction count is the number of Josephson junctions on a superconducting integrated circuit chip. Josephson junctions are active circuit elements in superconducting circuits. The Josephson junction count is a measure of circuit or device complexity, similar to the transistor count used for semiconductor integrated circuits.

Examples of circuits using Josephson junctions include digital circuits based on SFQ logic (e.g., RSFQ, RQL, adiabatic quantum flux parametron), superconducting quantum computing circuits, superconducting analog circuits, etc.

Integrated circuits 

The superconducting integrated circuits listed here must have been fabricated and tested, but are not required to be commercially available. Chip area includes the full extent of the chip. 

Maker column may include organizations that designed and fabricated the chip.

Process column information: minimum linewidth, Josephson junction critical current density, superconducting layer number and materials.
Conversions for units of critical current density: 1 MA/m2 = 1 µA/µm2 = 100 A/cm2.

Memory
Memory is an electronic data storage device, often used as computer memory, on a single integrated circuit chip. The superconducting integrated circuits listed here must have been fabricated and tested, but are not required to be commercially available. Chip area includes the full extent of the chip.

References 

Integrated circuits
Digital electronics
Quantum electronics
Superconductivity
Josephson effect